The Australian Recording Industry Association Music Awards (commonly known informally as ARIA Music Awards, ARIA Awards, or simply the ARIAs) is an annual series of awards nights celebrating the Australian music industry, put on by the Australian Recording Industry Association (ARIA). The event has been held annually since 1987 and encompasses the general genre-specific and popular awards (these are what is usually being referred to as "the ARIA awards") as well as Fine Arts Awards and Artisan Awards (held separately from 2004), Achievement Awards and ARIA Hall of Fame – the latter were held separately from 2005 to 2010 but returned to the general ceremony in 2011. For 2010, ARIA introduced public voted awards for the first time.

Winning, or even being nominated for, an ARIA award results in a lot of media attention and publicity on an artist, and usually increases recording sales several-fold, as well as chart significance – in 2005, for example, after Ben Lee won three awards, his album Awake Is the New Sleep jumped from No. 31 to No. 5 in the ARIA Charts, its highest position. In October 1995 singer-songwriter Tina Arena became the first woman to win Album of the Year for Don't Ask (1994) and Song of the Year for "Chains". Before the ceremony the album had achieved 3× platinum (for shipment of 210,000 copies) and by year's end it was 8× platinum (560,000 copies) and had topped the end of year albums chart.

History

In 1983, the Australian Recording Industry Association (ARIA) was established by the six major record companies then operating in Australia, EMI, Festival Records, CBS (now known as Sony Music), RCA (now known as BMG), WEA (now known as Warner Music) and PolyGram (now known as Universal) replacing the Association of Australian Record Manufacturers (AARM) which was formed in 1956. It later included smaller record companies representing independent acts/labels and has over 100 members.

Australian TV pop music show Countdown presented its own annual awards ceremony, Countdown Music and Video Awards, which were co-produced by Carolyn James (also known as Carolyn Bailey) from 1981 to 1984 and, in the latter two years, in collaboration with ARIA. ARIA provided peer voting for some awards, while Countdown provided coupons in the related Countdown Magazine for viewers to vote for populist awards. At the 1985 Countdown awards ceremony, held on 14 April 1986, fans of INXS and Uncanny X-Men scuffled during the broadcast and as a result ARIA decided to hold their own awards. Australian music journalist, Anthony O'Grady, described the fans of Uncanny X-Men, "screeching dismay and derision every time their heroes were denied a prize. Finally, when INXS were announced Best Group and Michael Hutchence walked towards the stage, X-Men fans unfurled a 2-metre banner reading: '@*l! OFF POCK FACE'."

After that ceremony ARIA withdrew their support for the Countdown awards. Meanwhile, four music industry representatives had met in Sydney: a talent manager Peter Rix and three record company executives Brian Harris, Peter Ikin and Gil Robert. Rix summarised the outcome, "the industry deserved a peer-voting Awards night and it needed to be sanctioned by" ARIA. Its "primary purpose was to strive for some sort of objective overview of excellence in recording." Rather than the ARIA board pay the entire cost of the event, "we cooked up a scheme whereby the ARIA Awards would be funded by individual record companies buying tickets for a dinner." Rix and his group approached ARIA board members, Paul Turner (also managing director of WEA) and Brian Smith (BMG's managing director) then-chairperson of ARIA. After several months of arguing for the change, Rix was appointed chair of "a committee to convene the inaugural ARIA Awards."

Starting with the first ceremony, on 2 March 1987, ARIA administered its own entirely peer-voted ARIA Music Awards, to "recognise excellence and innovation in all genres of Australian music" with an annual ceremony. Initially included in the same awards ceremonies, it established the ARIA Hall of Fame in 1988, it held separate annual ceremonies from 2005 to 2010, the Hall of Fame returned to the general ceremony in 2011. The ARIA Hall of Fame "honours Australian musicians' achievements [that] have had a significant impact in Australia or around the world".

The first ceremony, in 1987, featured Elton John as the compere and was held at the Sheraton Wentworth Hotel, Sydney. There were no live performances at the early ARIAs, music for both walk on/walk off was supplied by a nightclub dj, Rick Powell. All subsequent ceremonies were held in Sydney except the 1992 event at World Congress Centre, Melbourne. For 2010, ARIA introduced public voted awards for the first time. Winning, or even being nominated for, an ARIA award results in a lot of media attention and publicity on an artist, and may increase recording sales several-fold, as well as chart significance – in 2005, for example, after Ben Lee won three awards, his album Awake Is the New Sleep jumped from No. 31 to No. 5 in the ARIA Charts, its highest position.

Broadcast history

The first five ARIA Awards were not televised, at the very first award ceremony on 2 March 1987, the host, Elton John, advised the industry to keep them off television "if you want these Awards to stay fun". In June of that year Countdown still had its own awards ceremony, which was televised, "so there was no thought of going to TV." The first televised ARIA Awards ceremony occurred in 1992, all subsequent ceremonies were televised. They were broadcast on Network Ten from 2002 to 2008 and returned in 2010. Nine Network aired the ceremony on 26 November 2009, its digital channel, GO!, aired the 2011 ARIA Music Awards on 27 November 2011.

Controversy

At the 1988 ceremony a fracas developed between band manager, Gary Morris, accepting awards for Midnight Oil, and former Countdown compere, Ian "Molly" Meldrum, who was presenting. They conflicted over visiting United Kingdom artist, Bryan Ferry, who had also presented an award. Morris objected to Ferry's presence and insulted him, Meldrum defended Ferry and then scuffled with Morris. Also in that year Midnight Oil were nominated for Best Indigenous Record for Diesel and Dust despite having no Indigenous members. Morris objected to that decision by ARIA, "an Indigenous Award should go to an indigenous band." In 1995 electronic music group, Itch-E and Scratch-E, won the inaugural award for "Best Dance Release" for their single, "Sweetness and Light". Band member, Paul Mac thanked Sydney's ecstasy dealers for their help. One of the sponsors of the awards, that year, was the National Drug Offensive. In 2005 Mac explained that he did not expect to win and so had not prepared a speech. His speech was bleeped for the TV broadcast.

During the 2004 voting process, former 3RRR radio DJ Cousin Creep (also known as Craig Barnes), published his user name and password on a music site, Rocknerd, allowing public votes, before being removed from voting two days later. The 2007 ARIA Awards telecast was marred by controversy after it was revealed by the ABC's Media Watch programme that Network Ten had used subliminal advertising during the course of the broadcast, which under the Australian Media and Broadcasting rules is illegal. Network Ten disputed the finding; however, their basis for defence was criticised by Media Watch, demonstrating an ignorance of the rules.

Tony Cohen, a record producer and audio engineer for Nick Cave and the Cruel Sea, who won three Artisan Awards in mid-1990s, described the ARIA Board's determination of general award winners, "I find them a bit hypocritical those ARIAs. I mean, the awards for the technical people are quite honest but the ones for the actual artists, basically the record companies just sit down at a meeting and decide which one of their acts are going to win this year and all, that sort of thing. It's like a promotion thing." He specifically pointed to Gabriella Cilmi's winning six trophies in 2008, "like that girl who won everything... who only had one song. It's a great song but, I mean, I'd rather see a little longevity first... I wish her luck and everything but you just don't, especially with kids that young."

The 2010 telecast was criticised in media reports: Crikey's Neil Walker decried the "infamously shambolic Sydney Opera House fiasco", The Punch's Rebekah Devlin speculated on it being the worst ever telecast, "it felt like we’d stumbled into some raging A-list party and we definitely weren’t invited [...] Guests who were there said it was a great night, but it reignites the debate of what the Arias are actually all about… is it an event staged for the musicians and the people there, or is it for a TV audience?", while Daily Telegraphs Kathy McCabe felt the "underlying problem with the past two years’ telecasts is they have tried to be all things to all people and do way too much" and advised that ARIA should get "professionals to do the job professionally, give them ample time to rehearse and allow them to protest when the words just don’t work". In 2011 Dallas Crane's vocalist and guitarist, Dave Larkin hoped for improvement from ARIA and the telecast, "[s]o gross was last year’s 'stubby-on-the-opera-house-steps' screaming match, that it still burns a brutal reflux just thinking what horrible depths our embattled industry and its unfortunate viewership plummeted to on that grievous evening of small screen hell" and felt their main flaw was that the "ARIAs never seem to take enough time or pride educating the masses on our local industry legends ... There never seems to be enough reference or homage paid to great Aussie pop and rock trailblazers who made and continue to make Australian music what it is today".

Nomination process
To be eligible, a release must be commercially available within the specified period for a given year. Material must be previously unrecorded, thus ruling out most live albums. A recording can be nominated within multiple categories, but only one genre category (for example, an album could not be simultaneously nominated for Best Pop Release and Best Dance Release). Re-released recordings are not eligible and compilations are not eligible.

Artists must either be Australian citizens, or have applied for or attained permanent resident status and have resided in Australia for at least six months within the specified period. For bands, at least half the members of the group must meet this requirement. If a recording refers to both an individual and a band (for example, Dan Kelly & the Alpha Males), it must be nominated only the basis of the individual or the band, not mixed or both.

Some categories have further requirements as specified below:

 Album/Single of the Year: Recording must appear in the ARIA Top 100 Albums or Singles chart respectively during the specified period.
 Breakthrough Artist (Album/Single): Artist must not have previously reached the final five nominations in any ARIA awards category for any release, or have been in a group that has done so, or have a previous release in the Top 50 release charts.
 Best Rock Album: "Recording must be directed toward Contemporary Rock, Modern Rock and Active Rock formats."
 Best Adult Contemporary Album: "Recording must be directed toward Adult Contemporary formats."
 Best Pop Release: "Recording must be directed toward CHR/Top 40 formats."
 Best Independent Release: Recording must be released and funded by an ARIA member that is not a member of a multinational corporation.
 Best Music DVD: Compilations may enter this category. Content must be at least 60% original. The release must be eligible to appear on the ARIA Music DVD chart (this means most "bonus disc" releases are unlikely to be eligible).
 Best Comedy Release: Compilations are acceptable. Album, single and DVD releases are all eligible. Content must be 100% original.
 Best Children's Album: Compilations are acceptable (but content must be 100% original, having been recorded specifically for that album). Form and content must be aimed at a pre-teen audience.
 Best Dance Release: Compilations are acceptable. "Artists working primarily within the dance genre, e.g.: House, Techno, Trance, Hardcore, Garage, Breakbeat, Drum & Bass, Disco and Electronica are eligible. In the case of a remixed album or single, the production team(s) and the original recording artist(s) must both meet the artist eligibility criteria, and the release must qualify for inclusion in either the ARIA Album or Single chart."
 Best Urban Release: "Artists working primarily within the urban genre, e.g.: R&B, hip-hop, soul, funk, reggae, and dancehall, are eligible. In the case of a remixed album or single, the production team(s) and the original recording artist(s) must both meet the artist eligibility criteria, and the release must qualify for inclusion in either the ARIA Album or Single chart. The ARIA member must also nominate whether the production team or the original recording artist would be the recipient of the award." This category was discontinued in 2018 and replaced by Best Hip Hop Release and Best Soul/R&B Release from 2019.
 Sales awards: A company may enter up to five recordings in a category. For these categories, the recording does not have to be first released during the specified period, so these categories are two of the few where recordings can be nominated more than once. These categories were discontinued in 2010.

Judging process

Sales awards are judged by an independent audit. The Hall of Fame and Lifetime Achievement awards are awarded at the discretion of the ARIA Board. Genre categories are judged by "voting schools" that consist of 40–100 representatives from that genre. The remaining generalist categories are the "voting academy", which, in 2009, consisted of 1106 representatives from across the music industry.

Members of the academy are kept secret. Membership is by invitation only. An individual record company may have up to eight members on the academy. The only artists eligible to vote are winners and nominees from the previous year's awards.

Categories

The ARIA Awards are given in four fields: ARIA Awards (for general and genre categories), Fine Arts, Artisan and Public Vote. With the exception of the Public Vote field, all award winners and nominees are determined by either a "voting academy" or a "judging school"; the nominees for the public voted categories are determined by ARIA with the public choosing the winner.
In the following tables, all the categories are listed in order of the year they were first given; any box in the "last awarded" column that says "N/A" is a current award. The years are linked to their corresponding ceremony and the ordinal numbers beside the year correspond to the order they were presented.

Current

Retired

Note: Originally awarded at the same ceremony as the ARIA Awards, the ARIA Fine Arts and Artisan Awards have been awarded at a separate ceremony from 2004. In 2020 both Fine Arts and Artisan Awards returned to the general ceremony.

Hall of Fame and achievement awards

ARIA Hall of Fame inductees have been installed annually from the category's inception, as from 1988 except 2000 and 2021 (no inductees), ARIA Outstanding Achievement Awards (periodically, first in 1988), ARIA Special Achievement Awards (periodically, first awarded in 1989), ARIA Lifetime Achievement Awards (periodically, first awarded in 1991) and ARIA Icon Awards (first in 2013).

Originally artists were inducted into the Hall of Fame at the same ceremony as the ARIA Awards, in 2005 the inaugural ARIA Icons: Hall of Fame ceremony was held separately with another inductee at the later ARIA Awards ceremony — from 2008 to 2010 the ARIA Hall of Fame ceremony was a stand-alone event with no later inductees. From 2011 the Hall of Fame ceremony was held at the same time as the ARIA Awards.

The trophy
The ARIA award trophy, used since 1990, is a tall triangular pyramid made of solid stainless steel. The 1987–1989 trophies were designed by Philip Mortlock, while the 1990 design was by Mark Denning. The Channel V award which is "V" shaped, and silver, or in the case of the award of 2008, red. As from 2005, The Hall of Fame trophy, from the Denning design, was golden coloured metal with ARIA printed in black near the base on two sides, on the third side is the award title (ARIA ICONS: HALL OF FAME), awardee name and date printed on a plaque.

ARIA Music Awards by year
To see the full article for a particular year, please click on the year link.

1   Rolf Harris was stripped of his induction in 2014 after being convicted for indecent assault.

Most awards/nominations

Highest number of awards received by an artist with the number of their nominations:

See also 

Music of Australia

Notes

Citations

References 

 
 
 
 
 
 
 
 
 
  Note: User may be required to access archived information by selecting 'The History', then 'By Award', 'Producer of the Year' and 'Option Show Nominations'.

External links
 

Australian Recording Industry Association
 
1987 establishments in Australia
Awards established in 1987
Australian comedy awards
Australian music awards
Network 10 specials
Nine Network specials